A guinea pig is a domestic rodent.

Guinea pig may also refer to:
 Guinea pig, a slang term for a test subject of any species:
 Human subject research
 Animal testing
 The Guinea Pig Club, a group of surgical patients
 100,000,000 Guinea Pigs, a 1933 book about the pharmaceutical and food industries
 Guinea Pig (film series), a controversial series of Japanese films
 Guinea Pig (TV series), a Discovery Channel series
 The Guinea Pig (film), a 1948 film starring Richard Attenborough
 The Guinea Pig (play), a 1929 comedy by Preston Sturges
 The Guinea Pig EP, the first album released by the band Angry Salad

See also
 Guinea (disambiguation)
 Pig (disambiguation)